Rudbeckia missouriensis, the Missouri coneflower, is a flowering plant in the family Asteraceae and is found mostly in the Ozarks of Missouri and Arkansas in the central United States.

References

missouriensis